Matt Sedillo (born December 18, 1981) is a Chicano political poet, essayist, and activist.

Biography 
Sedillo was born on December 18, 1981 in El Sereno, Los Angeles, California. His poetry was compared to that of Amiri Baraka's by the Hampton Institute, He has been described as the best political poet in America by investigative journalist Greg Palast and as the "poet laureate of struggle" by historian Paul Ortiz. He has been described as one of the most important working class intellectuals of our time. He has spoken at the San Francisco International Poetry and the Texas Book Festival. He was featured on C-SPAN at the 2016 Left Forum and has had numerous international speaking engagements including Casa de las Americas in Havana, Cuba.

At Re/Arte Centro Literario in Boyle Heights, Los Angeles, California, Sedillo facilitates a writers workshop every Wednesday. He is currently the literary director at the dA Center for the Arts in Pomona, California.

Honors and awards

Works 

 For What I Might Do Tomorrow Caza de Poesía. 2010. 
 Mowing Leaves of Grass FlowerSong Press. 2019. 
 City on the Second Floor FlowerSong Press. 2022

References

External links 
 Official Author Website
 The dA Center for the Arts
 Re/Arte Centro Literario

Chicano art
21st-century American poets
1981 births
Living people
Writers from Los Angeles
American male poets
Poets from California
Hispanic and Latino American poets